The foreign relations of Eritrea are the policies of the Eritrean government by which it administers its external relations with other nations. Since its independence, Eritrea's foreign relations have been dominated by conflict and confrontation, both in the regional and international arenas. It has maintained often troubled, and usually violent, relations with its neighbors, including brief armed conflicts with Yemen and Djibouti and a destructive war with its bigger-neighbour, Ethiopia. At present, Eritrea has very tense relations with neighboring Ethiopia and Djibouti. Relations in the international arena also have been strained since the last decade, particularly with major powers. What appeared cordial relations with the US in the 1990s turned acrimonious following the border war with Ethiopia, 1998-2000. Although the two nations have a close working relationship regarding the ongoing war on terror, there has been a growing tension in other areas. Ties with international organizations such as the United Nations, the African Union, and the European Union have also been complicated in part because of Eritrea's outrage at their reluctance to force Ethiopia to accept a boundary commission ruling issued in 2002.

International organizations
Eritrea is a member of the United Nations, the African Union, and is an observing member of the Arab League.

Eritrea holds a seat on the United Nations' Advisory Committee on Administrative and Budgetary Questions (ACABQ).

Eritrea also holds memberships in the International Bank for Reconstruction and Development, International Finance Corporation, International Criminal Police Organization (INTERPOL), Non-Aligned Movement, Organisation for the Prohibition of Chemical Weapons, Permanent Court of Arbitration, Port Management Association of Eastern and Southern Africa, and the World Customs Organization.

Bilateral relations

See also
 Arab–Eritrean relations
 Eritrea–United States relations
 Denmark–Eritrea relations
 List of diplomatic missions in Eritrea
 List of diplomatic missions of Eritrea

References